Sarcophanops is a genus of broadbills (family Eurylaimidae) found in the Philippines.

Species
Two species are recognized:

References

 
Bird genera